Number One Cup was an American indie rock band based in Chicago, Illinois, United States.

History
After leaving his band Eliot in 1993, guitarist Seth Cohen was interviewed by the Chicago weekly newspaper Newcity; when asked what he might do next, Cohen mentioned attending a show featuring Unrest, Gastr Del Sol, and Stereolab in Chicago. This caught the attention of guitarist Pat O'Connell and drummer Michael Lenzi, who both called Cohen after reading the article. As a result, the three formed Number One Cup. 

Number One Cup released their first single, "Connecticut" in 1994 on Sweet Pea Records and started playing live shows. Cohen's former Eliot bandmate John Przyborowski filled in on bass until the band recruited Jenni Synder. They released their second single, "Indie Softcore Denial" on Sweet Pea before Synder left the band. 

The trio then signed with Flydaddy Records and released their debut full-length album, Possum Trot Plan, in 1995. Pat "Tiger" Reis briefly joined the band on bass, before Przyborowski once again filled in and eventually joined full-time. The band's single "Divebomb" was a minor hit on the UK Singles Chart in 1996, peaking at number 61. 

In 1998, after recording their third album, People, People, Why Are We Fighting?  Cohen broke his neck while playing hockey, and tour plans had to be postponed until he recovered. Around this time Kurt Volk replaced Przyborowski on bass, but their 1998 album was to be their last and the band split in 1999.

Cohen and Lenzi went on to form the group The Fire Show, active from 1999 to 2002.

Members
Seth Cohen - Guitar
Pat O'Connell - Guitar
Michael Lenzi - Drums
John Przyborowski - Bass
Jenni Snyder - Bass
Pat Reis - Bass
Kurt Volk - Bass

Discography
Possum Trot Plan (Flydaddy Records, 1995)
Kim Chee Is Cabbage EP (Flydaddy, 1996)
Wrecked by Lions (Flydaddy, 1997)
People People, Why Are We Fighting? (Flydaddy, 1998)

References
Notes

Further Reading
Review of Wrecked by Lions. Pitchfork Media.
Review of People People, Why Are We Fighting?. Pitchfork Media.

Indie rock musical groups from Illinois
Musical groups from Chicago